Let Them Talk (Spanish: Digan lo que digan) is a 1968 Argentine musical film.

Cast
Raphael as Rafael Gandía
Serena Vergano as Blanca
Ignacio Quirós as Miguel
Susana Campos as Blanca's Friend
Darío Vittori as Luis
Hernán Guido as Arencibia
Aldo Bigatti as Mario
Alicia Duncan as Blanca's aunt

References

External links 
 

1968 films
1960s Spanish-language films
Films scored by Antón García Abril
Films directed by Mario Camus
Argentine musical drama films
Spanish musical drama films
Films shot in Argentina
1960s Argentine films